Yuriy, Yuri, or Yury Yakovlev may refer to:

 Yury Yakovlev (1928–2013), Soviet film and theatre actor
 Yuriy Yakovlev (Bulgarian actor) (1930–2002), Bulgarian stage and film actor
 Yuri Yakovlev (ice hockey) (born 1957), Russian ice-hockey team president 
 Yuri Yakovlev (writer), screenwriter of the 1969 film Umka

See also
 Yakovlev (surname)